Sponge is a South Korean TV variety show that debuted on 8 November 2003 on KBS2.  The show claims to be "infotainment," and revolves around presenting various pieces of trivia in an entertaining fashion.  The pieces of trivia are often sent in by viewers who wish to broadcast some piece of little known information they have. Sponge ended in November 2007 because of low TV ratings and continued as Sponge 2.0 in a new format.

Hosts
The show had two hosts: Kim Kyung-ran and Lee Hwi-jae. Additionally each week a panel of celebrities is present.

Former hosts
1st: Hwang Soo-gyeong
2nd: Kim Kyung-ran
3rd: Goh Min-jeong
All of them (from the list) are the KBS announcers.

The show's format
Each piece of trivia is introduced as a sentence with a blank missing.  A panel of guests including singers, comedians, and actors then attempt to fill in the missing blank.  After the guests make their guesses, the answer is revealed and then proof is offered to show how this piece of trivia is true.

Following the video evidence a panel of 50 judges vote on how interesting the particular piece of trivia was, rating it on a scale of one to five stars.  For people that submitted items that received five stars, a cash prize of 1,000,000 won is awarded.

However, the new version, Sponge 2.0, has a different format. Instead of viewers submitting items, professionals from specific fields would appear on the set and provide intriguing and interesting facts which is presented with video footage.

Instead of 50 judges, the show now invites 100 people to usually assist in on-stage polls and demonstrations. The panel of celebrities remain.

Top web searches
Each week the program ended with that week's top internet searches on Naver.
In version 2 however, the program ends with a way to develop the brain and stimulate it.

Criticism
The show was criticized for being very similar to a trivia program produced by Fuji TV in Japan.  The show in question was called Hey! Spring of Trivia was first broadcast in October 2002.  When Sponge debuted the following year, producers of Trivia no izumi complained about the stylistic similarities between the two shows, which lead the producers of Sponge to slightly retool the format.

See also
 MythBusters
 Naver

External links 
 Official website

Korean Broadcasting System original programming
2003 South Korean television series debuts
2010s South Korean television series
Korean-language television shows
2012 South Korean television series endings
South Korean reality television series